Musethica is a Spanish non-governmental organization that teaches classical music to music student.  It was founded in 2012 in Zaragoza, Spain by Avri Levitan and Carmen Marcuello.  A key part of the program is a large number of student concerts in the community.

Musethica has affiliates in China, Israel, and other European nations.

Model 
The central objective of Musethica is to educate music students by giving them the opportunities to perform publicly on a frequent basis to a variety of audiences. The students participate in master classes conducted by professional musicians, who often perform with the students.

The model provides the students with the opportunity to play a large number of yearly concerts, which improves their musical and instrumental abilities.r. it is considered a new element in music education,

History 
The Musethica concept was conceived in 2009 by Avri Levitan.  It was launched in 2012 in Zaragoza under the auspices of Levitan and Professor Carmen Marcuello. 
The concerts comprise the a repertoire of chamber music from solo performances to octet.

As of 2017, Musethica had  five active associations: in Spain, Germany, Israel, Poland and Sweden. Musethica is also active in France, China and Austria.

References

External links 
 

Arts organizations established in 2012
2012 establishments in Spain
Music organisations based in Spain